Chetek (YTB-827) was a United States Navy  named for Chetek, Wisconsin.

Construction

The contract for Chetek was awarded 9 August 1971. She was laid down on 5 May 1973 at Marinette, Wisconsin, by Marinette Marine and launched 25 October 1973.

Operational history

Chetek served as a tug in the 5th Naval District at Norfolk, VA. Stricken from the Navy List 29 February 1996, Chetek was transferred to the US Army of Corps of Engineers, Buffalo, N.Y., 1 March 1996.

Cheteks fate is unclear.  Navsource indicates that ex-Chetek was renamed Demelon.  Further, she is listed for sale as of 2007.  Another source indicates that ex-Chetek was renamed Chetek and at some point sold to Basic Towing, Inc. and renamed Nickelena.

References

External links
 

 

Natick-class large harbor tugs
Ships built by Marinette Marine
1973 ships